May Davenport Seymour Eckert (1883–1967) was an American stage actress descended from a long line of famous actors and later a patron of the arts scene in New York. She was the daughter of actor and stage manager William Gorman Seymour and actress May Marian Caroline Davenport. She had three siblings. Her maternal grandparents were E. L. Davenport and Fanny Vining Davenport, two famous mid-19th century actors. Her mother May Marian was a sister of famous 19th-century star Fanny Davenport and Hollywood actor Harry Davenport. May Eckert married William Stanley Eckert in 1908; one of their children was actress Anne Seymour who usually dropped her surname professionally.

May Seymour began her theatre career c.1901. In 1903 she was appearing in The Little Princess on Broadway. Other Broadway plays were The Lady of Lyons, The Triumph of Love, The Ruling Power, Brother Jacques, Beauty and the Barge, The Marriage of William Ashe. In 1905 she appeared in A Doll's House produced by Charles Frohman and starring Ethel Barrymore. She appeared in the double-bill 1905 Frohman presentation Pantaloon/Alice-Sit-by-the-Fire which between the two plays featured all three Barrymore siblings Ethel, Lionel and Jack.

After her children became adults she appeared with daughter Anne for nine years on radio in a program called Against the Storm. She also became involved with the Museum of the City of New York creating a theater collection of memorabilia and becoming its curator.

Eckert died in New York October 5, 1967.

References

External links

May Davenport Seymour Eckert in later years (NYPublic Library, Billy Rose collection)
May Davenport Seymour and Frederick O'Neal, 1963; celebrating the 50th anniversary of Actor's Equity (Museum City of New York)

1883 births
1967 deaths
American curators
American women curators
American stage actresses
American radio actresses
20th-century American actresses